Melanochromis robustus is a species of cichlid in the Cichlidae endemic to Lake Malawi.  This species can reach a length of  TL.

References

robustus
Taxa named by Donald S. Johnson
Fish described in 1985
Taxonomy articles created by Polbot